The Bologa is a left tributary of the river Șes in Romania. It flows into the Șes near Văleni.

References

Rivers of Romania
Rivers of Bistrița-Năsăud County
Rivers of Mureș County